, also simply known as the JMSDF Yokosuka Naval Base, is a group of ports and land facilities of the Japan Maritime Self-Defense Force (JMSDF), which are scattered in multiple districts of Yokosuka City, Kanagawa Prefecture, and where the Yokosuka District Force, etc. are located. It is not officially called a base, but it is used as a common name. The base sits alongside the United States Fleet Activities Yokosuka.

It has a facility where people can train with Japan's technology to create water pressure in the deep sea (water depth 450 meters). Not only allied countries such as the United States, Thailand, and Vietnam, but also the navy of hypothetical enemy countries such as Russia are visiting.

History
On 26 April 1952, the Coastal Safety Force was established from the Japan Coast Guard, and the Coastal Safety Force Yokosuka Regional Supervision Department was established at the site of the former Suirai Naval Academy (currently the 2nd Technical School) in Tauraminatocho. On August 1, with the establishment of the National Safety Agency, the Coastal Security Force alongside Yokosuka District Force were both reorganized. On 16 September 1953, Guards Technical School ws newly published in Taura and October 19, Yokosuka District Force moves from Taura to the current location, Nishihemicho.

On 16 January 1956, the Maritime Self-Defense Force Technical School was relocated to Etajima. Since education such as institutions will continue to be conducted in Yokosuka, the Maritime Self-Defense Force Technical School Yokosuka Branch School was to be newly established. On 1 March, Self-Defense Forces Yokosuka Hospital opens in Kurihama District.

On 1 April 1958, the Yokosuka Defense Force, Kenzaki Guard Station and Kannonzaki Guard Station were newly added to the Yokosuka Base Guard. Maritime Self-Defense Force Technical School Yokosuka Branch School renamed to Maritime Self-Defense Force 2nd Technical School. On 1 June 1959, it was renamed from Yokosuka Base Guard to Yokosuka Guard. On September 1, Yokosuka Education Corps was newly established in the Takeyama area.

On 1 February 1961, new editions includes the Yokosuka Supply Station and Yokosuka Factory. On March 1, the Explosive Ordnance Disposal Unit was newly added to the Yokosuka Defense Force. On 1 March 1965, the Funakoshi Division was newly added to the Yokosuka Guard.

On 2 March 1970, addition to the base includes Yokosuka Zoushusho and Yokosuka Sanitary Corps. Abolished Yokosuka Works. On 11 April 1974, more addition to the base includes Yokosuka Music Corps. December 27, 1977, the Maritime Self-Defense Force Diving Medical Experiment Team is newly established in the Kurihama area.

In 1980, Yoshikura Pier completed. On 1 July 1985, the Yokosuka torpedo control station was abolished. New edition of Yokosuka torpedo maintenance station. On July 1, 1987, the Yokosuka garrison was abolished. Reorganization of the guard. New edition of Yokosuka Base Service Corps. Kenzaki guard station was abolished. On 31 March 1988, the Self-Defense Forces Yokosuka Hospital was relocated to its current location (Taura District).

On 8 December 1998, Yokosuka Supply Station and Yokosuka Repair Station were integrated and reorganized into Yokosuka Repair Supply Station, and the torpedo maintenance station and guided ammunition maintenance station were also integrated to Yokosuka Ammunition Maintenance Supply Station. Establishment of the Maritime Self-Defense Force Ship Supply Office and transferred it to the Maritime Self-Defense Force Supply Headquarters.

On 15 April 2010, the Hemi Dock was completed.

On 11 March 2011, In response to the Tohoku-Pacific Ocean Earthquake, all operable ships belonging to Yokosuka Base were dispatched off Sanriku as a disaster dispatch.

On 26 March 2012, Yokosuka Guard Kannonzaki Guard Station was abolished and on September 1, Self-Defense Forces Yokosuka Hospital Education Department moved from Kurihama area to Taura area.

Facilities and operational units

Funakoshi District 
Self Defense Fleet Command
Fleet Escort Force
Fleet Submarine Command
Mine Warfare Force Headquarter
Fleet Research and Development Command
Fleet Intelligence Command
Oceanography ASW Support Command
Yokosuka District Force
41st Mine Warfare Force
Yokosuka Base Service Corps
Yokosuka Sanitary Corps
Communications Command
Maintenance audit team

Yoshikura District 
Yokosuka District General Manager 
Yokosuka Repair and Supply Station
1st Escort Flotilla Command
1st Escort Squadron
2nd Escort Flotilla
6th Escort Squadron
Communications Command
Yokosuka System Communication Corps
Maritime Self-Defense Force police force
Yokosuka District Police

Nagaura District 
Yokosuka Base Service Corps
Yokosuka Sanitary Corps

Arai District 
Yokosuka District Force
Yokosuka Ammunition Maintenance Supply Station
Yokosuka Guard
Fleet Escort Force
Maritime Training Guidance Group Command
Fleet Submarine Command
Submarine Education and Training Corps

Kusugaura District 
Fleet Submarine Command
2nd Submarine Squadron
Oceanographic Command / Anti-submarine Support Group
 Anti-submarine data corps
Yokosuka District Force
 Yokosuka Repair and Supply Station

Taura District 
Maritime Self-Defense Force 2nd Technical School
Maritime Self-Defense Force Supply Headquarters
Maritime Self-Defense Force Ship Supply Office
Maritime Self-Defense Force Diving Medical Experiment Corps
Yokosuka District Force
Yokosuka Repair and Supply Station

Takeyama District 

 Yokosuka District Force
 Yokosuka Education Corps
 Yokosuka Music Corps
 Yokosuka Sanitary Corps

Self-Defense Forces Yokosuka Hospital 

 Self Defense Fleet
 Mine Warfare Force

Gallery

See also

 JMSDF Ōminato Base

References

 Port PC Structure Achievements Collection Port PC Structure Study Group
 Instruction regarding the organization of the torpedo maintenance station (Maritime Self-Defense Force instruction No. 21 of 1985)
 Maritime Self-Defense Force Yokosuka District Force HP Hemi Dock Completion Event (H22.4.15)
 Mutual jurisdiction between the Nagaura Port Facility under the jurisdiction of the Ministry of Land, Infrastructure, Transport and Tourism and the Kurihama Oil Storage Station of the Maritime Self-Defense Force February 28, 2014, South Kanto Defense Bureau
 Yokosuka Port Port Plan 2016 (2016) Partial review Yokosuka City p.8
 Minutes of the 34th Yokosuka City Port Council, July 24, 2014, Yokosuka City p. 8
 Ministry of Defense Maritime Self-Defense Force official twitter

External links

Yokosuka Naval Base official website

Military installations established in 1954
1954 establishments in Japan
Yokosuka

Yokosuka
Japanese Navy submarine bases